Klingsor's Last Summer is a novella by Hermann Hesse.

Written over the course of a few weeks in July and August 1919, it was published in December 1919 in the Deutsche Rundschau. It was later published (by S. Fischer Verlag) in a volume which included Kinderseele and Klein und Wagner.

Plot
The story is an account of the final months of the life of Klingsor, a forty-two-year-old expressionist painter. A lover of poetry, a heavy drinker, and a womanizer, he spends his final summer in southern Switzerland, torn between sensuality and spirituality and troubled by feelings of impending death.

Character list
Klingsor
Louis the cruel
Ersilia
The Queen of the mountains
The Armenian astrologer
Edith

1919 German-language novels
Novels by Hermann Hesse
Künstlerroman
Novels about artists
Novels set in Switzerland
1919 German novels
German bildungsromans
S. Fischer Verlag books